Things commonly known by the name witch girl or witch girls (in various capitalizations) include:

 Eleniak Witch Girl, a character from the video game Wild Arms 2
, a 1914 film starring Mary Fuller
Witch-Girl, He Yueer (aka Yao nu He Yueer), a Mandarin language film featuring Peter Yang
Majokko (魔女っ子, little witch), a subgenre of Japanese fantasy light novels, manga, anime, and video games
 Universal Witch Girl, a character in the video series Trinity Universe
 A 1988 single by Fire Dept as part of the Graveyard Stomp compilation